Lantian may refer to:

Lantian County, of Xi'an, Shaanxi, China
Lam Tin, Hong Kong (spelled 'Lantian' in Mandarin pinyin)
Lantian man, a sub-species of Homo Erectus
Lantian Township in Chengkou County, Chongqing, China